Euryglossa may refer to:
 Euryglossa (bee), a genus of bee in the family Colletidae
 Euryglossa, a genus of fishes in the family Soleidae, synonym of Brachirus
 Euryglossa Motschoulsky, [1860], a genus of beetles in the family Staphylinidae, synonym of Leucocraspedum
 Euryglossa Fauvel, 1866, a genus of beetles in the family Staphylinidae, synonym of Pagla